123 Democratic Alliance (Chinese: 一二三民主聯盟) was a pro-Kuomintang political party in Hong Kong. Established in 1994 by a group of pro-Taiwan, pro-democracy and pro-business politicians, it aims at striving for the  unification of China, to strive for a free, democratic, and wealthy China, and to establish a democratic and prosperous Hong Kong. It remained a small party until it was dissolved in 2000 due to the lack of financial support from the Taiwan government, after the Kuomintang's defeat in the presidential election.

History
The party was formed by the supporters of the Kuomintang government on Taiwan in 1994. It was represented by Sin Ling Yum in the Legislative Council of Hong Kong (LegCo) from 1995 to 1997. It was excluded from the Provisional Legislative Council, the interim body which largely controlled by the Beijing government. All candidates were defeated in the 1998 LegCo elections.

The party won six seats in the 1999 District Council elections. Due to lack of funding, the party did not file any candidates in the 2000 LegCo elections (although some of the losers continued to take part as independent participants or supporters of other parties), and was subsequently dissolved on 3 December 2000 due to the lack of financial support from the Taiwan government. The last chairman of the alliance was Tai Cheuk-yin.

Election performance

Legislative Council elections

Municipal elections

District Council elections

References

1994 establishments in Hong Kong
2000 disestablishments in Hong Kong
Defunct political parties in Hong Kong
Liberal parties in Hong Kong
Political parties disestablished in 2000
Political parties established in 1994
Three Principles of the People